Kristoff Raczyński (born June 9, 1974) is a Russian-born Polish actor, film producer, screenwriter and TV host of Polish descent. His career began in the late 1990s and early 2000s when he produced, wrote and acted in the 2004 Mexican film Matando Cabos. He currently hosts a YouTube channel, Kristoff Cine, where he does film criticism. Raczyñski is often credited simply as "Kristoff".

Early life

Raczyñski was born in Moscow to Polish parents. In 1982 his father took the entire family to Mexico City without knowing a single word in Spanish. Since then he has lived in Mexico City. Kristoff has said that he will always remember how his mother used to take him at 6 in the morning under -20 °C to obtain only 3 pieces of bread. At age 16, he worked cleaning elephant excrement in a circus. He earned his first wage working as a "cerillo" (Spanish word for "match", a popular way to call kids who work packing up grocery at supermarkets).

Career
He began his career in the Centro de Educación Artística (CEA), Televisa's school of performing arts. He spent several years playing supporting characters in Mexican telenovelas like: Vivo Por Elena (1998) and Ramona (2000), among others.
In 2001, Kristoff and Tony Dalton hosted Televisa's TV show No Te Equivoques (2001), with a high audience rating. The show was viewed as a Mexican version of Jackass.

In 2004, he produced, acted and co-wrote the Mexican film Matando Cabos  with fellow actor Tony Dalton and was directed by Alejandro Lozano. In an interview, he said that the most risky decision that he has taken in his life was to leave No Te Equivoques to do Matando Cabos.

He likes music and his favorite singer is David Bowie. He likes the works of Pablo Picasso, especially The Guernica. His main hobbies include reading books about quantum physics and playing video games.

In 2005, he began to do some collaborations with Horacio Villalobos in his television program Válvula De Escape and Desde Gayola on Telehit. In 2006, he began to host the program ID, which caused so much controversy that it won the public and producer Guillermo Del Bosque decided to give him a program of half an hour on Telehit. On Tuesday 6 May 2008, his program El Show Del Polaco began to air. The show was cancelled some months afterwards. Currently, he remains working for the same TV network.

In 2012, he wrote and directed the short film Confesiones de un table (also called Confesiones de un tabledance meaning "Confessions of a Tabledance"), produced by Ernesto Ahmad. This short film participated in the Short Film Corner of the Cannes Film Festival in that year. It was also featured in the International Film Festival of Guadalajara in 2013.

Personal life
Kristoff is not married and has no children.

Filmography

Feature films
Matando Cabos (2004), co-writer, actor

Confesiones de un tabledance (2012), writer and director

Chapo: El escape del siglo (2016), actor

Loco fin de semana (2019), director

Television

Vivo Por Elena (1998)

Ramona (2000)

No Te Equivoques (2000–2003)

Desde Gayola (2003-2004)

Sexo con Kristoff (2007-)

Cine con Kristoff (2007-)

Gárgaras Con Kristoff (2007-2012)

El Show Del Polaco (2008–2009)

Macarena (2020)

References

1963 births
Living people
Male actors from Moscow
Mexican screenwriters
Mexican film directors
Mexican male film actors
Mexican male telenovela actors
Mexican male television actors
Mexican people of Polish descent
Mexican people of Russian descent
Soviet emigrants to Mexico
Russian people of Polish descent